Florian Jenni (born 24 March 1980 in Lieli) is a Swiss chess grandmaster.

When he was five years old, he was taught to play chess by his mother and later on by his father. He was awarded the title of Grandmaster in 2003. On the March 2010 FIDE rating list his Elo rating is 2520.

Jenni, who studied economics and plays' the piano in his free time, won tournaments in Lenk (2002), the Swiss Championship in Silvaplana (2003), and Winterthur (2005).

He is also a member of the Swiss National Team.

References 
 
 

Swiss chess players
1980 births
Living people
Chess grandmasters